is a prefecture of Japan located in the Chūbu region of Honshū. Aichi Prefecture borders Mie Prefecture to the west, Gifu Prefecture and Nagano Prefecture to the north, and Shizuoka Prefecture to the east.

Overview
Nagoya is the capital and largest city of Aichi Prefecture, and the fourth-largest city in Japan, with other major cities including Toyota, Okazaki, and Ichinomiya. Aichi Prefecture and Nagoya form the core of the Chūkyō metropolitan area, the third-largest metropolitan area in Japan and one of the largest metropolitan areas in the world. Aichi Prefecture is located on Japan's Pacific Ocean coast and forms part of the Tōkai region, a subregion of the Chūbu region and Kansai region. Aichi Prefecture is home to the Toyota Motor Corporation. Aichi Prefecture had many locations with the Higashiyama Zoo and Botanical Gardens, The Chubu Centrair International Airport, and the Legoland Japan Resort.

Geography 

Located near the center of the Japanese main island of Honshu, Aichi Prefecture faces the Ise and Mikawa Bays to the south and borders Shizuoka Prefecture to the east, Nagano Prefecture to the northeast, Gifu Prefecture to the north, and Mie Prefecture to the west. With an area of  it accounts for approximately 1.36% of the total surface area of Japan.

The western part of the prefecture is dominated by Nagoya, Japan's third largest city, and its suburbs, while the eastern part is less densely populated but still contains several major industrial centers. Due to its robust economy, for the period from October 2005 to October 2006, Aichi was the fastest growing prefecture in terms of population, beating Tokyo, at 7.4% and around with after Saitama Prefecture.

 23% of the total land area of the prefecture was designated as Natural Parks, namely the Aichi Kōgen, Hida-Kisogawa, Mikawa Wan, and Tenryū-Okumikawa Quasi-National Parks along with seven Prefectural Natural Parks.

Cities

Thirty-eight cities are located in Aichi Prefecture.

Aisai
Ama
Anjō
Chiryū
Chita
Gamagōri
Handa
Hekinan
Ichinomiya
Inazawa
Inuyama
Iwakura
Kariya
Kasugai
Kitanagoya
Kiyosu
Komaki
Kōnan
Miyoshi
Nagakute
Nagoya (capital)
Nishio
Nisshin
Okazaki
Ōbu
Owariasahi
Seto
Shinshiro
Tahara
Takahama
Tokoname
Tōkai
Toyoake
Toyohashi
Toyokawa
Toyota
Tsushima
Yatomi

Towns and villages
These are the towns and villages in each district:

Aichi District
Tōgō
Ama District
Kanie
Ōharu
Tobishima
Chita District
Agui
Higashiura
Mihama
Minamichita
Taketoyo
Kitashitara District
Shitara
Tōei
Toyone
Nishikasugai District
Toyoyama
Niwa District
Fusō
Ōguchi
Nukata District
Kōta

Demographics

As of 2001, Aichi Prefecture's population was 50.03% male and 49.97% female. 139,540 residents (nearly 2% of the population) are of foreign nationality.

Population by age (2001)

Mergers

History 

Originally, the region was divided into two provinces of Owari and Mikawa. After the Meiji Restoration, Owari and Mikawa were united into a single entity. In 1871, after the abolition of the han system, Owari, with the exception of the Chita Peninsula, was established as Nagoya Prefecture, while Mikawa combined with the Chita Peninsula and formed Nukata Prefecture. Nagoya Prefecture was renamed to Aichi Prefecture in April 1872 and was united with Nukata Prefecture on November 27 of the same year.

The government of Aichi Prefecture is located in the Aichi Prefectural Government Office in Nagoya, which is the old capital of Owari. The Aichi Prefectural Police and its predecessor organisations have been responsible for law enforcement in the prefecture since 1871.

The Expo 2005 World Exposition was held in Seto and Nagakute.

Etymology
In the third volume of the Man'yōshū there is a poem by Takechi Kurohito that reads: "The cry of the crane, calling to Sakurada; it sounds like the tide, draining from Ayuchi flats, hearing the crane cry". Ayuchi is the original form of the name Aichi, and the Fujimae tidal flat is all that remains of the earlier Ayuchi-gata. It is now a protected area.

For a time, an Aichi Station existed on the Kansai Line (at the time the Kansai Railway) between Nagoya and Hatta stations, but its role was overtaken by Sasashima-raibu Station on the Aonami Line and Komeno Station on the Kintetsu Nagoya Line.

Economy

Gross domestic product (2018) is the second largest in Japan, the shipment value of manufactured goods (2018) is the first in Japan, annual product sales (2019) is the third largest in Japan, and it's agricultural output (2018) is eighth in Japan. Aichi's agriculture industry and commerce are all ranked high in Japan, and the industrial structure is well-balanced.
Main industry
 Automotive industry
 Aerospace Industry
 Ceramics Industry
 Steel, Alloy steel Industry

Companies headquartered in Aichi include the following.

Companies such as Fuji Heavy Industries, Mitsubishi Motors, Pfizer, Sony, Suzuki, Bodycote, and Volkswagen Group also operate plants or branch offices in Aichi.

International relations

Sister Autonomous Administrative division

 Victoria, Australia – 
 Jiangsu, China – 
 Bangkok, Thailand – 
 Guangdong, China – 
 Gyeonggi Province, South Korea – 
 Texas, United States – 
 Ho Chi Minh City, Vietnam – 
 Washington, United States – 
 Brussels, Flemish Region, Wallonia, Belgium – 
 Indiana, United States – 
 Kentucky, United States – 
 Occitanie, France – 
 São Paulo, Brazil –

Transport

Rail

JR Central
Tokaido Shinkansen
Tokaido Line
Chūō Main Line
Kansai Line
Taketoyo Line
Iida Line
Meitetsu
Nagoya Line
Inuyama Line
Komaki Line
Centrair Line
Tokoname Line
Seto Line
Toyokawa Line
Gamagori Line
Toyota Line
Chita Line
Mikawa Line
Bisai Line
Chikko Line
Tsushima Line
Kintetsu
Nagoya Line
Aonami Line
Nagoya Municipal Subway
Higashiyama Line
Meijo Line
Tsurumai Line (connecting to Meitetsu Toyota and Inuyama Line)
Sakura-dori Line
Meiko Line
Kamiiida Line (connecting to Meitetsu Komaki Line)
Toyohashi Railroad
Aichi Loop Line

People movers and tramways
Nagoya Guideway Bus
Linimo
Toyohashi Railroad

Road
Expressways and toll roads

Chuo Expressway
Higashi-Meihan Expressway（East Meihan Expressway）
Isewangan Expressway（Ise Bayside Expressway）
Meishin Expressway
Mei-Nikan Expressway
Nagoya Expressway
Shin-Meishin Expressway
Shin-Tōmei Expressway
Tokai-Hokuriku Expressway
Tomei Expressway
Chita Peninsula Road
South Chita Road
Chubu International Airport Connecting Road
Chita across Road
Nagoya Seto Road

National highways

Route 1
Route 19 (Nagoya-Kasugai-Tajimi-Nagiso-Matsumoto-Nagano)
Route 22 (Nagoya-Ichinomiya-Gifu)
Route 23 (Ise-Matsuzaka-Suzuka-Yokkaichi-Nagoya-Toyoake-Chiryu-Gamagori-Toyohashi)
Route 41 (Nagoya-Komaki-Inuyama-Gero-Takayama-Toyama)
Route 42
Route 151
Route 153
Route 154
Route 155 (Tokoname-Chita-Kariya-Toyota-Seto-Kasugai-Komaki-Ichinomiya-Tsushima-Yatomi)
Route 247
Route 248
Route 257 (Hamamatsu-Shinshiro-Toyota-Ena-Nakatsugawa-Gero-Takayama)
Route 259
Route 301
Route 302
Route 362
Route 363
Route 366
Route 419
Route 420
Route 473 (Gamagori-Okazaki-Toyota-Shitara-Hamamatsu)
Route 474
Route 475

Airports
Chubu Centrair International Airport
Nagoya Airfield

Ports
Nagoya Port – International Container hub and ferry route to Sendai and Tomakomai, Hokkaido
Mikawa Port – mainly automobile and car parts export and part of inport base
Kinuura Port – Handa and Hekinan

Education

Universities
National universities
Aichi University of Education
Graduate University for Advanced Studies - Okazaki Campus (National Institute for Basic Biology, Japan, National Institute for Physiological Sciences, Japan)
Nagoya Institute of Technology
Nagoya University
Toyohashi University of Technology

Public universities
Aichi Prefectural University
Aichi Prefectural University of the Arts
Nagoya City University

Private universities

Aichi Bunkyo University
Aichi Gakuin University
Aichi Gakusen University
Aichi Institute of Technology
Aichi Medical University
Aichi Mizuho College
Aichi Sangyo University
Aichi Shukutoku University
Aichi Toho University
Aichi University
Aichi University of Technology
Chubu University
Chukyo University
Daido University
Doho University
Fujita Health University
Globis University Graduate School of Management – Nagoya Campus
Japanese Red Cross Toyota College of Nursing
Kinjo Gakuin University
Meijo University
Nagoya Bunri University
Nagoya College of Music
Nagoya Gakuin University
Nagoya Keizai University
Nagoya Sangyo University
Nagoya University of Arts
Nagoya University of Arts and Sciences
Nagoya University of Commerce & Business
Nagoya University of Foreign Studies
Nagoya Women's University
Nagoya Zokei University
Nanzan University
Nihon Fukushi University
Ohkagakuen University
Okazaki Women's Junior College
Seijoh University
Seisa University – Nagoya Schooling Campus
Shigakkan University
Shubun University
Sugiyama Jogakuen University
Tokai Gakuen University
Tokyo University of Social Welfare – Nagoya Campus
Toyohashi Sozo College
Toyota Technological Institute
University of Human Environments

Senior high schools

Sports

The sports teams listed below are based in Aichi.

Baseball
Central League
Chunichi Dragons (Nagoya)

Soccer
J.League
Nagoya Grampus (Nagoya and Toyota)
JFL
FC Maruyasu Okazaki (Okazaki)
Tokai Regional League
FC Kariya (Kariya)
L.League
NGU Loveledge Nagoya (Nagoya)

Basketball
B.League
SAN-EN NeoPhoenix（Toyohashi and Hamamatsu）
SeaHorses Mikawa（Kariya）
Nagoya Diamond Dolphins（Nagoya）
Toyotsu Fighting Eagles Nagoya（Nagoya）
Aisin AW Areions Anjo（Anjō）

Volleyball
V.League
Toyoda Gosei Trefuerza (Inazawa)
JTEKT Stings（Kariya）
Denso Airybees (Nishio)
Toyota Auto Body Queenseis (Kariya)

Rugby
Top League
Toyota Verblitz (Toyota)
Toyota Industries Shuttles（Kariya）

Futsal
F.League
Nagoya Oceans（Nagoya）

Football
X-League
Nagoya Cyclones（Nagoya）
Kirix Toyota Bull Fighters (Toyota)
Aichi Golden Wings (Nagoya and Toyota)
AFL
Nagoya Redbacks Australian Football Club (AFL Japan)（Nagoya）

Tourism

Notable sites in Aichi include the Meiji Mura open-air architectural museum in Inuyama, which preserves historic buildings from Japan's Meiji and Taishō periods, including the reconstructed lobby of Frank Lloyd Wright's old Imperial Hotel (which originally stood in Tokyo from 1923 to 1967).

Other popular sites in Aichi include the tour of Toyota car factory in the city by the same name, the monkey park in Inuyama, and the castles in Nagoya, Okazaki, Toyohashi, and Inuyama.

Aichi Prefecture has many wonderful beaches. For example, Himakajima Beach, Shinojima Beach, Akabane Beach and Utsumi Beach.

Notable people from Aichi

 Manabu Kubota (born 1981) Football player who played for Yokohama FC and New Wave Kitakyushu.
 F Chopper Koga , bass player and leader of the rock band Gacharic Spin
 Yūki Ishikawa ( 石川祐希, Professional Volleyball Player, Japan National Team, Power Volley Milano Italy Super lega
 Syoh Yoshida (born 1984), Japanese artist
 Yuki Yamada (actor) (born 1990), Japanese actor
 Yoshiaki Katayama (born 1993), racing driver
 Tatsuya Kataoka (born 1975), racing driver
 Haruna Ono (musician), lead vocals and rhythm guitarist for the rock band Scandal
 Mami Sasazaki (musician), lead guitar and vocalist for the rock band Scandal
 Suzuki Ichiro (Professional baseball player, member of Japan national baseball team) and 2x time World Baseball Classic Champion
 Koji Kondo (born 1961) composer and pianist born in Nagoya who works on video game soundtracks for Nintendo

Festival and events
UNESCO Intangible Cultural Heritage
Owari Tsushima Tenno Matsuri（Aisai, Tsushima）
Inuyama Festival（Inuyama）
Kamezaki Shiohi Festival（Handa）
Chiryu Festival（Chiryū）
Sunari Festival（Ama District Kanie）

Others
Nagoya Festival（Nagoya City）
Tsutsui-chō/Dekimachi Tennō Festival（Nagoya Higashi-ku）
Miya Festival（Gamagōri）
Toyohama Sea bream Festival（Chita District Minamichita Town）
Okkawa Festival（Handa）
Hōnen Matsuri（Komaki）
Omanto festival（Takahama）
Kōnomiya Hadaka Matsuri（Inazawa）
Tezutsu Matsuri（Toyohashi, Toyokawa）
Nagashino festival（Shinshiro）
Mando festival（Kariya）
Isshiki Lantern Festival（Nishio）
Toba Fire Festival（Nishio）
Owari Tsushima Autumn Festival（Tsushima）

References

External links

Aichi Now-Official Site for Tourism Aichi
Aichi, HOME of the Samurai Spirit 

 
Chūbu region
Prefectures of Japan